Jean-Philippe Rameau (1683–1764) was one of the most important French composers and music theorists of the 18th century.

Rameau may also refer to:
 Rameau (crater), a crater on Mercury
 4734 Rameau (1982 UQ3), a main-belt asteroid 
 RAMEAU, a French-language equivalent of Répertoire de vedettes-matière de l'Université Laval (RVM) still in use today

People with the surname
 Emil Rameau (1878–1957), German theatre director and actor
 Pierre Rameau (1674–1748), French Maître à danser (Master of dance) and theorist

People with the given name
 Rameau Thierry Sokoudjou (born 1984), mixed martial artist
 Rameau Poleon, folk fiddler from Saint Lucia

See also
 Rameau's Nephew, a philosophical dialogue by Denis Diderot